Raúl Duarte may refer to:
 Raúl Duarte (footballer) (born 1969), Paraguayan football manager and player
 Raúl Duarte (basketball, born 1944), Peruvian basketball player
 Raúl Duarte (basketball, born 1963), Angolan basketball coach